Michael Ross Pollack (born April 26, 1994) is an American songwriter and record producer. He has written songs for artists such as Maroon 5, Justin Bieber, Miley Cyrus, Beyoncé, Selena Gomez, Katy Perry, Ed Sheeran, Jonas Brothers, Backstreet Boys, Lauv, Ben Platt, Zedd, Lizzo, Kelly Clarkson, Celine Dion, and many others. He achieved his first US Top 40 radio #1 in February 2020 with Maroon 5's "Memories", his second in February 2022 with Justin Bieber's "Ghost", and his third in February 2023 with Miley Cyrus's "Flowers". He acheived his first Billboard Hot 100 #1 in January 2023 with Miley Cyrus' "Flowers".

Early years and Billy Joel 
Pollack and his older sister were raised by their parents in Roslyn, New York. He started playing piano, singing, and writing songs at a young age. In his youth, he performed with a Billy Joel cover band and with Richie Cannata, Billy Joel's longtime saxophonist.

After graduating from high school, Pollack moved to Nashville, Tennessee to attend Vanderbilt University. During his freshman year, Billy Joel hosted a Q&A session for college students at Vanderbilt University's Langford Auditorium. Pollack, who was in the audience, asked for permission to accompany Joel on piano for a rendition of New York State of Mind, to which Joel agreed. A video of the performance was posted online and quickly went viral, landing Pollack appearances on NBC's Today show, Good Day New York, the Morning Mashup on SIRIUS XM Radio, and The Jeff Probst Show.

Music career 
The video also led to Pollack signing a joint publishing deal during his sophomore year of college with Warner Chappell Music and Pete Ganbarg, President of A&R at Atlantic Records, for its "Songs With A Pure Tone" label. He soon started collaborating with other songwriters, including Ingrid Andress in Nashville, while he finished his degree.

After graduating from college, Pollack moved to Los Angeles, California to live with fellow musicians Ari Leff and Michael Matosic. The trio went on to write dozens of songs for Leff and others. Pollack has also co-written songs for Beyonce, Justin Bieber, Celine Dion, Katy Perry, Miley Cyrus, Ed Sheeran, Maroon 5, Kelly Clarkson, Jason Mraz, Backstreet Boys, Lizzo, Jonas Brothers, Meghan Trainor, Demi Lovato, Michael Bublé, John Legend and Selena Gomez. 

In 2021, he co-wrote and executive produced the album Reverie by Ben Platt.

Pollack was named Songwriter of the Year at the 2022 BMI Pop Awards. Variety also listed him among "55 Queer Artists and Decision-Makers to Know in 2022." Additionally, Pollack was #10 on Genius's "Top 25 Songwriters of 2022" list.

In 2023, Pollack wrote "Flowers" by Miley Cyrus with Gregory Aldae Hein and Cyrus. The song debuted at number one on the Billboard Hot 100, Global 200, and Global 200 Excl. U.S. charts. In the song's first week it broke the Spotify record for most streams in a single week with more than 96 million streams. It broke that record the following week with more than 115 million streams in a week. Pollack  wrote several songs on Cyrus' eighth studio album Endless Summer Vacation with Cyrus and Gregory "Aldae" Hein. They were conceived only with piano, then evolving into their final versions. Pollack said that Cyrus decided to focus on songcraft before tackling the production.

Pollack is managed by Jamie Zeluck-Hindlin, founder of Nonstop Management.

Intervale Songs 
In 2020, Pollack formed a publishing company called Intervale Songs. His first signee was Nick Sarazen, a songwriter and producer from North Kingstown, Rhode Island. In 2022 he also signed Davin Kingston, a songwriter, producer and artist from Clermont, Florida.

Discography

Songwriting credits

Production credits

Awards and nominations

References

1994 births
Living people
American male songwriters
Record producers from New York (state)
People from Roslyn, New York
LGBT people from New York (state)
LGBT record producers
American LGBT songwriters